State Route 384 (SR 384) is a  north-south state highway in Tipton County, Tennessee.

Route description

SR 384 begins in the southern part of the county at an intersection with SR 14 (Austin Peay Highway). It heads north as Mount Carmel Road along a two-lane highway through farmland for several miles before entering Covington at an intersection with SR 59 (Hastings Way). The highway turns east along a concurrency with SR 59 before splitting off and turning north along S Main Street. SR 384 passes through some neighborhoods before turning right onto East Street. It becomes a four-lane undivided highway for a short distance before narrowing to two-lanes and bypassing downtown along its east side. The highway has an intersection with SR 54 (E Liberty Avenue), where it becomes Hope Street, and begins passing through industrial areas, where it turns west onto Industrial Road N. SR 384 comes to an end shortly thereafter at an intersection with US 51 (SR 3).

Major intersections

References

384
Transportation in Tipton County, Tennessee